Mount Clara is a peak rising to about  to the east of Mount Normann and south of Larsen Harbour, in southeast South Georgia. It was charted and named by Discovery Investigations personnel in 1927.

References

Mountains and hills of South Georgia